Entre ses mains is a 2005 French-Belgian drama film directed by Anne Fontaine. It is also known as In His Hands. The screenplay was written by Fontaine and Julien Boivent.

Plot
Claire Gauthier works for an insurance company. Laurent Kessler is a client. When she has to deal with him he tries to seduce her. In spite of her marriage and her daughter she agrees to dating him. When she learns more about Kessler it strikes her how strange he behaves and that he might be the serial killer who currently makes news by murdering women.

Cast
 Benoît Poelvoorde as Laurent Kessler
 Isabelle Carré as Claire Gauthier
 Jonathan Zaccaï as Fabrice Gauthier
 Valérie Donzelli as Valérie
 Agathe Louvieaux as Pauline 
 Bernard Bloch as directeur
 Véronique Nordey as Mme Kessler, Laurent's mother 
 Michel Dubois as Claire's father
 Martine Chevallier as Claire's mother

Awards and nominations
 César Awards (France)
 Nominated: Best Actor – Leading Role (Benoît Poelvoorde)
 Nominated: Best Actress – Leading Role (Isabelle Carré)
 Nominated: Best Writing – Adaptation (Julien Boivent and Anne Fontaine)
 Joseph Plateau Awards (Belgium)
 Nominated: Best Belgian Actor (Benoît Poelvoorde)

References

External links
 
 
 
 Entre ses mains at AlloCine 

2005 films
2000s French-language films
Films directed by Anne Fontaine
French drama films
2000s French films
Belgian drama films